Hold It In is the 20th studio album by the Melvins, released on October 14, 2014. The lineup for this album features Melvins stalwarts Buzz Osborne and Dale Crover joined by Butthole Surfers members Paul Leary and Jeff Pinkus.

Vinyl version
A single LP vinyl edition was released by Ipecac Recordings in December 2014, omitting the tracks "Eyes on You" and "House of Gasoline". A 10" single of Bride of Crankenstein was released by Amphetamine Reptile Records, featuring the omitted tracks.

Track listing
All songs written by Osborne, Pinkus and Crover except where noted.

Personnel
King Buzzo – guitar, lead (3, 5, 7, 9, 12) and backing vocals
Dale Crover – drums, backing vocals
Paul Leary – guitar, lead (2, 6, 10) and backing (3) vocals, engineer
JD Pinkus – bass, lead (1, 8, 11) and backing vocals

Additional personnel
Toshi Kasai – engineer
Stephen Haas – engineer
John Golden – mastering
Brian Gardner – mastering (2, 6 & 10)
Mackie Osborne – design

References

Melvins albums
2014 albums
Ipecac Recordings albums